Bald Hill is a hill in the Willamette Valley west of Corvallis, Oregon.

Bald Hill is part of the Bald Hill Natural Area, a  park that contains  of trails through oak savanna remnants and denser forest which are managed to provide habitat for endemic plant species and wildlife.

Geography
Bald Hill is located at the western edge of the Willamette Valley, where it meets the Oregon Coast Range. South of the Cardwell Hills, Bald Hill is separated from the foothills of the Coastal Range by Oak Creek and Mulkey Creek.

History
The Bald Hill Natural Area was purchased by the Greenbelt Land Trust in 1990 and turned over to the City of Corvallis in 1993. In 2013, the land trust bought the neighboring Bald Hill Farm, and additional trail connections were added between Bald Hill and nearby parks.

References

Mountains of the Oregon Coast Range
Landmarks in Oregon
Landforms of Benton County, Oregon
Corvallis, Oregon
Willamette Valley
Municipal parks in Oregon